Semyonovka is a rural locality (a selo) and the administrative center of Semyonovsky Selsoviet of Svobodnensky District, Amur Oblast, Russia. The population was 327 as of 2018. There are 5 streets.

Geography 
Semyonovka is located 38 km northwest of Svobodny (the district's administrative centre) by road. Sukromli and Markuchi are the nearest rural localities.

References 

Rural localities in Svobodnensky District